Crataegus nitida, the glossy hawthorn or shining hawthorn, is a species of flowering plant in the family Rosaceae, native to the US states of Illinois, Missouri and Arkansas. Hardy to USDA zone 5, it is useful in landscaping applications where a small, showy tree with thorns is desired.

References

nitida
Flora of Illinois
Flora of Missouri
Flora of Arkansas
Plants described in 1901
Flora without expected TNC conservation status
Taxa named by N. E. Brown
Taxa named by George Engelmann
Taxa named by Nathaniel Lord Britton
Taxa named by Charles Sprague Sargent